George Mead or George Meade may refer to:
 George Meade (merchant) (1741-1808), American merchant and grandfather of George Meade 
 George Meade (1815–1872), United States Army officer and civil engineer
 George Herbert Mead (1863–1931), American philosopher, sociologist, and psychologist
 George Robert Stowe Mead (1863–1933), British theosophist 
 George L. Meade (1869–1925), New York politician
 George J. Mead (1891–1949), American aircraft engineer
 Eliza Allen or George Mead (1926 – after 1951)

See also
 George Meade Easby (1918-2005), great-grandson of George Meade and a famous antique collector